Robert Amos "Friday" Davis (February 2, 1899 – July 15, 1970) was a Canadian ice hockey winger.

Career 
Davis played three games in the National Hockey League with the Detroit Red Wings during the 1932–33 season. The rest of his career, which lasted from 1923 to 1936, was spent in various senior and minor leagues.

Career statistics

Regular season and playoffs

External links
 

1899 births
1970 deaths
Anglophone Quebec people
Canadian ice hockey right wingers
Detroit Olympics (IHL) players
Detroit Red Wings players
Duluth Hornets players
Eveleth Rangers players
Ice hockey people from Montreal
People from Lachine, Quebec